Safwan Khalil (born 15 May 1986 in Tripoli, Lebanon) is a taekwondo athlete from Australia.  He competed at the London Olympics in the 58 kg division, losing in a bronze medal match against Alexey Denisenko.  Born in Tripoli, Lebanon, he has lived in Australia since he was a child, attending Lurnea High School in south-western Sydney and training at his brother's gym, Global Martial Arts. His brother Ali Khalil, is also his coach, and the Australian Olympic coach for 2012.,

Khalil is engaged to fellow Olympic taekwondo athlete Carmen Marton. The couple were married under Islamic law (but not under Australian civil law) prior to the London Olympics in 2012.

Kahalil qualified for the Rio 2016 Olympics, which will be his second Olympics as a competitor.

Khalil qualified for the Tokyo 2020 Olympics. In the men's 58 kg event in the round of 16, he lost to Ramnarong Sawekwiharee 23-7 and therefore did not advance any further in the competition. Australia at the 2020 Summer Olympics details the results in depth.

References

External links
 

1986 births
Living people
Australian male taekwondo practitioners
Olympic taekwondo practitioners of Australia
Taekwondo practitioners at the 2012 Summer Olympics
Taekwondo practitioners at the 2016 Summer Olympics
Sportspeople from Tripoli, Lebanon
Lebanese emigrants to Australia
Sportspeople of Lebanese descent
Australian Muslims
Universiade medalists in taekwondo
Universiade gold medalists for Australia
Medalists at the 2011 Summer Universiade
Taekwondo practitioners at the 2020 Summer Olympics
21st-century Australian people